Gerald Battrick (27 May 1947 – 26 November 1998) was a Welsh tennis player who reached as high as No. 3 in Britain (and world No. 53), winning at least 6 titles.

Personal life
Gerald Battrick was born on 27 May 1947 in Bridgend, Glamorgan, where his father was the Medical Officer.

Tennis career

Juniors
Battrick won the junior titles of Great Britain, Belgium and France and represented Britain in the Davis Cup. In 1965 he won the French Open Boys' Singles.

Pro tour
In 1971 he won the singles title at the Dutch Open in Hilversum, defeating Australian Ross Case in the final in three straight sets, and the British Hard Court Championships in Bournemouth where he won the final against Željko Franulović in four sets. In doubles, Battrick reached the quarterfinals of the French Open in 1968 and 1970 and at Wimbledon in 1975.

He played for the Great Britain Davis Cup team in 1970 and 1971 compiling a record of two wins and three losses. In 1972 Battrick joined Lamar Hunt's World Championship Tennis circuit.

World Team Tennis
Battrick played for the co-ed Pittsburgh Triangles of World TeamTennis in 1974 and 1975. He was part of the Triangles 1975 league championship team.

Career finals

Singles: 7 (1 title, 3 runner-ups)

Doubles (1 title, 4 runner-ups)

References

External links
 
 
 

Welsh male tennis players
French Championships junior (tennis) champions
1998 deaths
1947 births
Sportspeople from Bridgend
British male tennis players
Grand Slam (tennis) champions in boys' singles